Tom Dillon (born 1 October 1983) is a rugby union player previously with Newcastle Falcons in Premiership Rugby. His position of choice is as a centre.

See also
Rugby in the United Kingdom

References

External links
Newcastle Falcons profile

1983 births
Living people
Newcastle Falcons players
Place of birth missing (living people)